Bamber is both an English surname and a given name. Notable people with the name include:

Surname:
 Bessie Bamber (fl. 1900–1910), British artist
 Dave Bamber (b. 1959), English former professional footballer
 David Bamber (b. 1954), British actor
 Earl Bamber (b. 1990), New Zealand motor racing driver
 Edward Bamber (1646-??), English Roman Catholic priest
 Helen Bamber (1925–2014), English psychotherapist
 Jack Bamber (1895–1971), English footballer
 Jamie Bamber (b. 1973), British actor
 Jeremy Bamber (b. 1961), convicted murderer
 Jim Bamber (b. 1946), English cartoonist
 John Bamber (footballer, born 1912) (1912-??), English footballer
 Mary Bamber (1874–1938), English suffragist and trade unionist
 Mike Bamber (d. 1988), chairman of Brighton & Hove Albion Football Club (1973–83)

Given name:
 Bamber Gascoigne (1935–2022), English television presenter
 Bamber Gascoyne (disambiguation)

Other:
 Bamber Boozler, virtual host of the Teletext quiz game Bamboozle!

See also
Bamber Lake, New Jersey
Bamber Bridge, Preston, Lancashire
Bamber Bridge F.C.
Bamber Bridge railway station
Bamber's Green, Essex